Rubén Rojo Pinto (1922–1993) was a Spanish-Mexican actor.

Selected filmography

 Ahora seremos felices (1938) - Radio Station boy #2 (uncredited)
 My Children (1944) - Eduardo
 Imprudencia (1944)
 Adán, Eva y el diablo (1945)
 Escuadrón 201 (1945) - Manuel Ceballos
 Sol y sombra (1946)
 El puente del castigo (1946)
 Smoke in the Eyes (1946) - Juan Manuel
 Soledad (1947) - Carlos
 Cortesã (1948)
 Algo flota sobre el agua (1948) - Lalo
 Dueña y señora (1948) - Luis
 El dolor de los hijos (1949) - Librado
 Cuando baja la marea (1949)
 La hija del penal (1949) - Ernesto del Villar
 The Great Madcap (1949) - Pablo
 Un cuerpo de mujer (1949) - Javier
 La liga de las muchachas (1950) - Pablo
 Un grito en la noche (1950)
 Mujeres en mi vida (1950) - Javier Arias
 Cabellera blanca (1950) - Roberto Palacios
 Mala hembra (1950)
 El sol sale para todos (1950)
 Aventurera (1951) - Mario Cervera
 En carne viva (1951) - Arturo
 La reina del mambo (1951)
 El gendarme de la esquina (1951) - Luis
 Sensualidad (1951) - Raúl Luque
 Daughter of Deceit (1951) - Paco
 We Maids (1951) - Felipe
 The Girl at the Inn (1951) - Juan Luis / Carlos de Osuna
 La boca (1951)
 La huella de unos labios (1952) - Felipe Rivas
 La loca (1952) - Esteban de la Garza
 Estrella de Sierra Morena (1952) - Carlos
 Women's Town (1953) - Adolfo
 The Seducer of Granada (1953) - Carlos
 Two Paths (1954) - Miguel
 Cursed Mountain (1954) - Juan
 It Happened in Seville (1955) - Juan Antonio
 Alexander the Great (1956) - Philotas
 The Legion of Silence (1956) - Chapek
 Embajadores en el Infierno (1956) - Teniente Luis Durán
 Le schiave di Cartagine (1956) - Flavius Metellus
 Horas de pánico (1957)
 Amore a prima vista (1958) - Principe Carlos
 La frontera del miedo (1958) - Pablo Beltrán
 Ama a tu prójimo (1958) - Abel
 Las locuras de Bárbara (1959)
 La mujer y la bestia (1959) - Martín
 Venta de Vargas (1959) - Capitán Pierre
 El amor que yo te di (1960) - Raúl
 Thaimí, la hija del pescador (1960) - Julio
 Fountain of Trevi (1960) - Roberto Proietti
 King of Kings (1961) - Matthew
 Ahí vienen los Argumedo (1962)
 The Brainiac (1962) - Reynaldo Miranda / Marcos Miranda
 Vuelven los Argumedo (1963)
 Santo in the Wax Museum (1963) - Ricardo Carbajal
 Condenados a muerte (1963) - Armando Salas
 Neutrón contra el criminal sádico (1964) - Oswaldo
 For One Thousand Dollars Per Day (1966) - Jason Clark
 Our Man in Casablanca (1966) - Shannon
 Cargamento prohibido (1966) - Roberto
 Requiem for a Gringo (1968) - Tom Leader
 They Came to Rob Las Vegas (1968) - Brian (uncredited)
 La esclava del paraíso (1968) - Ali
 Battle of the Last Panzer (1969) - Sgt. Schultz
 Relaciones casi públicas (1969) - Julián
 Siete minutos para morir (1969) - Al Monks / Domenico Lomonaco
 Cauldron of Blood (1970) - Pablo
 El huésped del sevillano (1970) - Diego de Peñalva
 El último día de la guerra (1970) - Pvt. O'Brien
 El juicio de los hijos (1971) - Alejandro
 Rimal min dhahab (1971)
 El látigo contra Satanás (1979) - Padre
 La dinastía de Dracula (1980) - Don Carlos Solórzano
 Mexican, You Can Do It (1985) - Sr. Rivera
 ¡Yerba sangrienta! (1986)
 Romero (1989) - Archbishop Chavez
 Bandas guerreras (1989)
 Víctimas de un asesino (1990) - Don Luis
 La mafia en Jalisco (1991) - (final film role)

References

Bibliography
 Raymond Durgnat. Luis Bunuel. University of California Press, 1977.

External links

1922 births
1993 deaths
Spanish male film actors
Spanish male television actors
Male actors from Madrid
Spanish emigrants to Mexico